Peniami Narisia (born 10 June 1997 in Fiji) is a Fijian rugby union player who plays for  in the Top 14. His playing position is hooker. Narisia has played for Brive since 2015. He made his debut for Fiji in 2021 against .

Reference list

External links
 

1997 births
Fijian rugby union players
Fiji international rugby union players
Living people
Rugby union hookers
CA Brive players